Ernest or Ernie Wright may refer to:

Ernest Vincent Wright (1872–1939), American author
Ernest Marshall Wright (born 1940), Irish-American biologist
G. Ernest Wright (1909–1974), Old Testament scholar and biblical archaeologist
Ernest Wright (English cricketer) (1894–1977), English cricketer
Ernest Wright (New Zealand cricketer) (1867–1940), New Zealand cricketer
Ernest Wright (scissors maker) Manufacturer of handmade scissors, established 1902 in Sheffield, England.
Ernest Gerard Wright (1901–1981), Australian politician
Vic Wright (Ernest Victor Wright, 1909–1964), footballer who played for Liverpool and Rotherham United in the 1930s
Ernest Wright (footballer) (1908–1977), English footballer for Mansfield Town
Ernie Wright (footballer) (1912–?), English football inside forward of the 1930s, who played for Crewe and Oldham Athletic
Ernie Wright (1939–2007), American football player